The 1924 Brooklyn Robins put up a good fight with the rival New York Giants before falling just short of the pennant. Staff ace Dazzy Vance led the league in wins, ERA, strikeouts and complete games to be named the National League Most Valuable Player.

Offseason 
 November 1924: Johnny Mitchell was purchased by the Robins from the Boston Red Sox.
 December 1924: Bert Griffith was traded by the Robins to the Washington Senators for Bonnie Hollingsworth.

Regular season

Season standings

Record vs. opponents

Notable transactions 
 April 16, 1924: Ray French was purchased from the Robins by the Chicago White Sox.
 April 25, 1924: Mike González was traded by the Robins to the St. Louis Cardinals for Milt Stock.
 May 16, 1924: Tiny Osborne was purchased by the Robins from the Chicago Cubs.
 June 14, 1924: Leo Dickerman was traded by the Robins to the St. Louis Cardinals for Bill Doak.
 December 17, 1924: Dutch Ruether was purchased from the Robins by the Washington Senators.

Roster

Player stats

Batting

Starters by position 
Note: Pos = Position; G = Games played; AB = At bats; H = Hits; Avg. = Batting average; HR = Home runs; RBI = Runs batted in

Other batters 
Note: G = Games played; AB = At bats; H = Hits; Avg. = Batting average; HR = Home runs; RBI = Runs batted in

Pitching

Starting pitchers 
Note: G = Games pitched; IP = Innings pitched; W = Wins; L = Losses; ERA = Earned run average; SO = Strikeouts

Other pitchers 
Note: G = Games pitched; IP = Innings pitched; W = Wins; L = Losses; ERA = Earned run average; SO = Strikeouts

Relief pitchers 
Note: G = Games pitched; W = Wins; L = Losses; SV = Saves; ERA = Earned run average; SO = Strikeouts

Awards and honors 
National League Most Valuable Player
Dazzy Vance

References

External links
Baseball-Reference season page
Baseball Almanac season page
Retrosheet
1924 Brooklyn Robins uniform
Brooklyn Dodgers reference site
Acme Dodgers page 

Los Angeles Dodgers seasons
Brooklyn Robins season
Brooklyn 
1920s in Brooklyn
Flatbush, Brooklyn